The following is a list of ecoregions in Rwanda, according to the Worldwide Fund for Nature (WWF).

Terrestrial ecoregions
By major habitat type:

Tropical and subtropical moist broadleaf forests
Albertine Rift montane forests

Tropical and subtropical grasslands, savannas, and shrublands
Victoria Basin forest–savanna mosaic

Montane grasslands and shrublands
 Ruwenzori-Virunga montane moorlands

Freshwater ecoregions
By bioregion:

Great Lakes
Lake Victoria Basin

See also 
 Wildlife of Rwanda

References 

Ecoregions
Ecoregions of Rwanda
Rwanda